Wolf Lake is a freshwater lake in the Sudbury District Census Division in the Canadian province of Ontario. The lake is located in the Wolf Lake Forest Preserve which is within (but not part of) the Chiniguchi River Waterway Provincial Park, a protected area. The Wolf Lake Forest Reserve contains the world's largest remaining old-growth red pine forest; with trees estimated to be between 140 and 300 years old. In March 2012, the provincial government reaffirmed the protected status of Wolf Lake Old Growth Forest Reserve  but in late May renewed the mining leases in the area as well.

See also
 Listing of the major lakes in Canada

References

External links
 
Red Pine Natural Range Distribution Map
Wolf Lake Mountain overlooks Wolf Lake, popular hiking destination
Old Growth Red Pine in the Wolf Lake Forest Reserve
2003 Fact Sheet including Wolf Lake Old Growth Forest Reserve

Wolf Lake (Ontario)